Milford Air Force Auxiliary Airfield was an auxiliary airfield of the United States Army Air Forces that was located in Milford, Penobscot County, Maine.

History
It operated from 1942 to 1948, when the Deblois Bombing Range opened nearby.  It was originally constructed for the Bangor Precision Bombing Range, and was also used by Dow Army Airfield.

After its closure, the site was used by Dow Air Force Base personnel for a survival school.

See also

References

Airfields of the United States Army Air Forces in Maine
Installations of the United States Air Force in Maine
Airports in Penobscot County, Maine
Airports established in 1942
Military installations established in 1942
Military installations closed in 1948
1942 establishments in Maine
1948 disestablishments in Maine